National Highway 16 (NH 16) is a major National Highway in India that runs along east coast of West Bengal, Odisha, Andhra Pradesh, and Tamil Nadu. It was previously known as National Highway 5.

The northern terminal starts at Dankuni National Highway 19 near Kolkata and the southern terminal is at Chennai, Tamil Nadu. It is a part of the Golden Quadrilateral project to connect India's major cities.

Route 

Many cities and towns across the states of West Bengal, Odisha, Andhra Pradesh, Telangana, and Tamil Nadu are connected by National Highway 16.

Route length in states:
 West Bengal: 
 Odisha: 
 Andhra Pradesh: 
 Tamil Nadu:

Junctions list

West Bengal
  near Kolkata
  near Kolkata
  near Kolaghat
  near Panskura
  near Kharagpur
  near Kharagpur
Odisha
  near Baleshwar
 NH 316A near Bhadrak
  near Panikoili
  near Chandikhol
  near Cuttack
  near Bhubaneswar 
  near Khordha
  near Palur
  near Brahmapur
  near Brahmapur
Andhra Pradesh
  near Narasannapeta 
  near Natavalsa
  at Kathipudi
  at Rajamahendravaram
  at Rajamahendravaram
  at Kovvur near Rajamahendravaram
  at Devarapalli
  at Gondugolanu near Eluru
  at Vijayawada 
  near Guntur
  Chilakaluripet
  near Ongole
  Singarayakonda
  Kavali
  Nellore
  Naidupeta
Tamil Nadu
  Janappachataram 
  Chennai
  Chennai Terminal point

Toll Plaza
The toll plazas from Kolkata to Chennai are listed below:
West Bengal
Dhulagori
Debra
Rampura (Kharagpur)
Odisha
Laxmannath (Jaleshwar)
Balasore
Bhandari Pokhari (Bhadrak)
Manguli
Godipada
Gurapali
Andhra Pradesh
Bellupada
Palasa
Madapam (Srikakulam)
Chilakapalem (Srikakulam)
Nathavalasa
Aganampudi (Visakhapatnam)
Vempadu
Krishnavaram
Ethakota
Unguturu
Kalaparru
Pottipadu
Kaza
Bollapali
Tanguturu
Musunnur
Venkatachalam
Buchanan
Sullurupeta
Tamil Nadu
Gummidipoondi
Nallur (Chennai)

See also 
 List of National Highways in India by highway number
 List of National Highways in India by State

Gallery

References

External links 

 NH 16 on OpenStreetMap

National highways in India
16
16
16
16
16
Transport in Kolkata
Transport in Chennai